VirtualDubMod was an open-source video capture and processing tool for Microsoft Windows, based on Avery Lee's VirtualDub.

History
Version 1.5.10.2 (build 2542) was released on 21 February 2006. VirtualDub's author, which hosts VirtualDubMod's forums, claimed that development had been abandoned. A version labeled as "VirtualDubMod 1.6.0.0 SURROUND", dated 9 April 2006, was released by a company called Aud-X. A Version 1.5.10.3 build 2550 was released by VirtualDub-Fr.

Features
VirtualDubMod merged several specialized forks of VirtualDub posted on the Doom9 forums. Added features included Matroska (MKV) support, OGM support, and MPEG-2 support.

One notable feature that remains missing in VirtualDubMod is the ability to program timed video captures, which was present in one VirtualDub fork called VirtualDubVCR.

Despite the abandonment of development of VirtualDubMod, some of its features can be added to VirtualDub through input plugins and ACM codecs provided by users on VirtualDub forums.

See also
 Avidemux - a cross platform program similar to VirtualDub, available for Linux, Windows and Mac.
 Comparison of video editing software
 List of video editing software

References

External links

Free video software
Free software programmed in C
Free software programmed in C++
Free software programmed in Pascal
Windows-only free software